Vegas was a musical outfit, active in the early 1990s. The band was formed by the former Specials and Fun Boy Three singer Terry Hall and Eurythmics member David A. Stewart, with Swedish music producer Olle Romö and Emmanuel Guiot making up the group (though like Tears for Fears and OMD before them, promotion was focused on the main duo). They released their self-titled album for RCA Records in 1992 as well as a trio of singles, including a cover of Charles Aznavour's number one hit "She".

Discography
Albums

Singles

References

English pop music duos
Male musical duos
British supergroups
Bertelsmann Music Group artists
RCA Records artists
Musical groups established in 1992
Musical groups disestablished in 1993
1992 establishments in England
1993 disestablishments in England